was a Japanese artist. In 1936 he won a bronze medal in the art competitions of the Olympic Games for his "古典的競馬" ("Classical Horse Racing in Japan").

References

External links
 profile 

1891 births
1972 deaths
Olympic bronze medalists in art competitions
20th-century Japanese painters
Olympic competitors in art competitions
Medalists at the 1936 Summer Olympics